General elections were held in the Netherlands Antilles on 1 September 1958. This snap election was held after discussions about changing the Charter for the Kingdom of the Netherlands.

Results

Curaçao
Population: 124,340 (31 December 1957)
Entitled to vote: 49,636
Valid votes: 44,611
Seats: 12
Average valid votes per seat: 3,717.58

Aruba
Population: 57,213 (31 December 1957)
Entitled to vote: 18,642
Valid votes: 17,161
Seats: 8
Average valid votes per seat: 2,145.125

Bonaire
Population: 5,663 (31 December 1957)
Entitled to vote: 2,623
Valide votes: 2,511
Seats: 1

SSS Islands
Population: 3,769 (31 December 1957, Sint Maarten: 1,558; Sint Eustatius: 1,087; Saba: 1,124)
Valide votes: 1,425
Seats: 1

Aftermath 
Jonckheer, Kroon, Van der Meer and Irausquin gave up their seats in parliament to become ministers in the Second Jonckheer cabinet. The first three were replaced by Hueck, Van der Linde-Helmijr and Bikker. Abbad was the replacement for Pieters Kwiers. Mid 1959 Leito succeeded Debrot.

Abraham died at the end of 1960.

References 
 Amigoe di Curaçao, 31 July 1958
 Amigoe di Curaçao, 4 August 1958
 Amigoe di Curaçao, 2 September 1958
 Amigoe di Curaçao, 3 September 1958
 Know Your Political History: St. Maarten, Saba, St. Eustatius, by Edgar Lynch & Julian Lynch, Election Watchnite Association, 1990, page 27

Elections in the Netherlands Antilles
Netherlands Antilles